The Second Battle of Ürümqi was a conflict in the winter of 1933–1934 at Ürümqi, between the provincial forces of Sheng Shicai and the alliance of the Chinese Muslim Gen. Ma Zhongying and Han Chinese Gen. Zhang Peiyuan. Zhang seized the road between Tacheng and the capital. Sheng Shicai commanded Manchurian troops and a unit of White Russian soldiers, led by Col. Pappengut. The Kuomintang Republic of China government had secretly incited Zhang and Ma to overthrow Sheng—even as they prepared to swear him in as governor of Xinjiang—because of his ties to the Soviet Union. Chinese Nationalist leader Gen. Chiang Kai-shek sent Luo Wen'gan to Xinjiang, where he met with Ma Zhongying and Zhang Peiyuan and urged them to destroy Sheng.

Ma and Zhang's Han Chinese and Chinese Muslim forces had almost defeated Sheng when he requested help from the Soviet Union. This led to the Soviet Invasion of Xinjiang and Ma Zhongying's retreat after the Battle of Tutung.

At this point Chiang Kai-shek himself was personally prepared to enter the battle, with over 150,000 troops and 15 million yuan ready to assist Ma in driving out Sheng Shicai. However, he was told that it would be impossible to guarantee the troops adequate food, water, fuel and other supplies, so Chiang cancelled the expedition. Sheng commented, "Chiang Kai-shek does not like my policies but he cannot do anything to me. I am too far away from his reach."

References

Conflicts in 1933
Conflicts in 1934
Xinjiang Wars
1933 in China
1934 in China
Urumqi